Guardian spirit may refer to:
 Tutelary deity, or guardian deity
 Guardian angel

See also
 Spirit guide (disambiguation)
 Totem, a spirit being, sacred object, or symbol that serves as an emblem of a group of people